Megan Healy is an American government official who served as secretary of labor in the cabinet of Virginia Governor Ralph Northam.

References

External links
Virginia Secretary of Labor

Living people
Year of birth missing (living people)
State cabinet secretaries of Virginia
Virginia Democrats
Women in Virginia politics
21st-century American politicians
21st-century American women politicians
Virginia Tech alumni
Virginia Commonwealth University alumni
Old Dominion University alumni